The Devil's Cage is a 1928 American silent drama film directed by Wilfred Noy and starring Pauline Garon, Ruth Stonehouse and Donald Keith. It is also known by the alternative title of The Girl in the Rain.

Cast
 Pauline Garon as Eloise 
 Ruth Stonehouse as Marcel 
 Donald Keith as Franklyn 
 Armand Kaliz as Pierre 
 Lincoln Stedman as Maurice

References

Bibliography
 Munden, Kenneth White. The American Film Institute Catalog of Motion Pictures Produced in the United States, Part 1. University of California Press, 1997.

External links
 

1928 films
1928 drama films
1920s English-language films
American silent feature films
Silent American drama films
Films directed by Wilfred Noy
American black-and-white films
1920s American films